The 2022 Atlantic Coast Conference (ACC) softball tournament will be held at Vartabedian Field on the campus of the University of Pittsburgh in Pittsburgh, Pennsylvania May 11 through May 14, 2022.  The event determines the champion of the Atlantic Coast Conference for the 2022 season.  The winner of the tournament will earn the ACC's bid to the 2022 NCAA Division I softball tournament.

This is the fourth year of a 10-team tournament. The 1st Round, quarterfinals and semifinals will be shown on the ACC Network. The championship game will be broadcast by ESPN2.

Format and seeding
The top 10 finishers of the ACC's 13 softball-player members will be seeded based on conference results from the regular season.  The bottom four seeds will play in an opening round to determine the quarterfinal matchups.

Tournament

Bracket

Game schedule and results

Championship game

All Tournament Team

MVP in boldSource:

References

2022 Atlantic Coast Conference softball season
Atlantic Coast Conference softball tournament
ACC softball tournament